Matthew 6:4 is the fourth verse of the sixth chapter of the Gospel of Matthew in the New Testament and is part of the Sermon on the Mount. This is the final verse of the Sermon's discussion of alms giving.

Content
In the King James Version of the Bible the text reads:
That thine alms may be in secret: and 
thy Father which seeth in secret 
himself shall reward thee openly.

The World English Bible translates the passage as:
so that your merciful deeds may be 
in secret, then your Father who sees 
in secret will reward you openly.

The Novum Testamentum Graece text is:
ὅπως ᾖ σου ἡ ἐλεημοσύνη ἐν τῷ κρυπτῷ
καὶ ὁ Πατήρ σου ὁ βλέπων ἐν τῷ κρυπτῷ
ἀποδώσει σοι.

For a collection of other versions see BibleHub Matthew 6:4

Analysis
The previous verses indicated that charitable giving should be in secret, perhaps even from oneself. This verse indicates that God will see even the most covert actions, and will ensure they are properly rewarded, because it's not whether one gives alms but how.
This is akin of the Jewish teaching: "One who gives charity in secret is greater than Moses" (T. Bab. Bava Bathra, fol. 9. 2.).

The verses 2–4 with verses 5–6 and verses 16–18 form three neatly symmetrical illustrations, about alms, prayer and fasting. The acts of justice, including giving alms, and like prayer and fasting, are between God and the doer, unlike Roman philanthropy, which tends to have public displays of good works.

Commentary from the Church Fathers
Pseudo-Chrysostom: For it is impossible that God should leave in obscurity any good work of man; but He makes it manifest in this world, and glorifies it in the next world, because it is the glory of God; as likewise the Devil manifests evil, in which is shown the strength of his great wickedness. But God properly makes public every good deed only in that world the goods of which are not common to the righteous and the wicked; therefore to whomsoever God shall there show favour, it will be manifest that it was as reward of his righteousness. But the reward of virtue is not manifested in this world, in which both bad and good are alike in their fortunes.

Augustine: But in the Greek copies, which are earlier, we have not the word openly.

Chrysostom: If therefore you desire spectators of your good deeds, behold you have not merely Angels and Archangels, but the God of the universe.

References

Sources

Further reading
Filson, Floyd V. A Commentary on the Gospel According to St. Matthew. London : A. & C. Black, 1960.
Fowler, Harold. The Gospel of Matthew: Volume One. Joplin: College Press, 1968
Hendriksen, William. The Gospel of Matthew. Edinburgh: Banner of Truth Trust, 1976
Hill, David. The Gospel of Matthew. Grand Rapids: Eerdmans, 1981
Lewis, Jack P. The Gospel According to Matthew. Austin, Texas: R.B. Sweet, 1976..

06:04
Secrecy
Alms in Christianity